Serwaa Kesse Girls' Senior High School is a female public school located in Duayaw Nkwanta in the Tano North Municipal District in the Ahafo Region of Ghana. In September 2022, they emerged as winners in the 2022 National Business Pitch Competition which was held in Accra.

History 
The school was established in 1965 initially as a Women's Training College by Kwame Nkrumah. On 15 August 1970, it was changed into a mixed public secondary school and named as Duayaw Nkwanta Secondary School. Finally in 2003, it was converted into a female senior high and renamed into its current name. The school was named after the First Queen mother of the Duayaw-Nkwanta Traditional Area.

In 2013, the headmistress of the school was Doris Bainn.

In 2018, the headmistress of the school was Mrs. Doris Cobbinah.

In 2019, the school took part in the qualifying stage of the National Science and Math Quiz.

Junior Achievement award 
In 2022, the school took part in the National Business Pitch Competition organized by the Junior Achievement Ghana. It was hosted by the Academic City University College in Accra. The competition brought together 16 schools across Ghana. Serwaa Kesse Girls' Senior High School emerged the winner.

Achievements 

 2016 National Debate Champions
 Ahafo regional Soccer and Volleyball champions
 Handball 2012-2016

Philanthropy 
In March 2018, the management and students of the school donated assorted items to the inmates of the Sunyani Female Prisons. They presented items such as biscuits, detergents, bags of rice, sanitary pads, clothing, sugar and cooking oil.

References 

High schools in Ghana
Public schools in Ghana
1965 establishments in Ghana